The 1920 Purdue Boilermakers football team was an American football team that represented Purdue University during the 1920 college football season. In their third season under head coach A. G. Scanlon, the Boilermakers compiled a 2–5 record, finished in ninth place in the Big Ten Conference with an 0–4 record against conference opponents, and were outscored by their opponents by a total of 103 to 36. Ferdinand J. Birk was the team captain.

Schedule

References

Purdue
Purdue Boilermakers football seasons
Purdue Boilermakers football